Alexander George Bray (born 25 July 1995) is a professional footballer who plays for National League South club Chippenham Town.

Club career

Swansea City
Bray was born in Bath, Somerset. He joined Swansea City's academy at the age of 15 following his release from Swindon Town. He was offered his first professional contract in April 2013 and was included in Swansea City's 2014–15 pre-season squad.

On 1 September 2014, Bray joined League Two club Plymouth Argyle on loan until 10 January 2015. He made his first-team debut on 6 September as a 58th-minute substitute for Jason Banton in a 1–0 win away against Luton Town. Bray had an eventful debut, earning a yellow card and playing a part in Plymouth's goal before suffering an injury after just 11 minutes on the pitch. It was later confirmed that Bray had suffered a ruptured anterior ligament which would require surgery. He returned to Swansea for treatment.

After returning to training in March 2015, Bray was ruled out for a further nine months with injury. Bray signed a one-year contract extension with Swansea in July 2015, keeping him at the club until June 2016.

Bray returned from injury in February 2016, and in March signed a one-year contract extension until June 2017.

Rotherham United
On 27 January 2017, Bray joined Championship club Rotherham United, initially on loan until 9 June 2017. The loan was made permanent on 10 March 2017 for an undisclosed fee, with Bray signing a contract until the end of the 2018–19 season.

Having failed to make a league appearance for Rotherham since November 2017, Bray joined Forest Green Rovers on loan on 31 January 2018 for the remainder of the 2017–18 season.

Bray joined National League North club York City on 9 November 2018 on loan until 12 January 2019. He made his debut the following day, starting in a 2–1 defeat away to Swindon Town in the FA Cup first round. He returned to Rotherham on 11 January 2019 having made 11 appearances for York, scoring once.

Bray joined National League South club Weston-super-Mare on 12 February 2019 on loan until the end of the 2018–19 season. On return from the loan spell, he was released by Rotherham United at the end of his contract.

Hereford
On 23 May 2019, Bray signed a one-year deal with Hereford.

Chippenham Town
On 14 February 2020, Bray signed for Chippenham Town.

International career
Bray has represented Wales at under-19 level.

Career statistics

References

External links
Profile at the Rotherham United F.C. website

1995 births
Living people
Sportspeople from Bath, Somerset
English footballers
Welsh footballers
Wales youth international footballers
Association football wingers
Swindon Town F.C. players
Swansea City A.F.C. players
Plymouth Argyle F.C. players
Rotherham United F.C. players
Forest Green Rovers F.C. players
York City F.C. players
Weston-super-Mare A.F.C. players
Hereford F.C. players
Chippenham Town F.C. players
English Football League players
National League (English football) players
English people of Welsh descent